The Radio România Actualităţi Awards 2011 (shortly RRA Awards) was held on March 13, 2011, in the Sala Radio (Radio Hall) of the Romanian Radio Broadcasting Company. The awards are yearly and they are developed by the Radio România Actualităţi, the main National Radio Channel. They will be broadcast by RRA, as well as by Radio România Muzical and Radio România Cultural. It will also be broadcast online and on TVR International all around the world. The nominations were announced via Adevărul newspaper, on February 4.

Inna topped the nominations, with four, "Artist of the Year", "Best Pop/Dance Act", "Best Pop/Dance Song" and "Album of the Year". She is followed by Alex, Ştefan Bănică, Jr., Smiley, Paula Seling, Nico and Mădălina Manole, with three awards. Keo, Andreea Banica and Andra have all two nominations.

Awards

General 
Artist of the Year

Inna
Paula Seling
Ovi
Mădălina Manole

Male Performance of the Year

Keo
Ştefan Bănică, Jr.
Horia Brenciu

Female Performance of the Year

Nico
Loredana Groza
Paula Seling

Songwriter of the Year

Smiley
Ovidiu Cernăuţeanu
Adi Cristescu
Nicolae Caragia

Best premise

Taxi - "Cele doua Cuvinte"
Guess Who - "Locul Potrivit"
Vunk - "Vreau o Tara ca Afara"

Best Junior Act

Maria Craciun
Andreea Olariu
Madalina Lefter

Pop 
Best Pop Album

Nico - "Love Mail"
Mădălina Manole - "09 Mădălina"
Ştefan Bănică, Jr. - "Superlove"

Best Pop Song

Catalin Josan - "Don't Wanna Miss You"
Paula Seling & Ovidiu Cernăuţeanu" - Playing With Fire"
Nico - "Poate Undeva"
Mădălina Manole - "Marea Dragoste"
Smiley - "Plec Pe Marte"

Pop/Dance

Best Pop/Dance Album

Inna - "Hot"
Alex - "Secret"
Smiley - "Plec departe"

Best Pop/Dance Song

Elena Gheorghe - "Disco Romancing"
Alex - "Don't Say It's Over"
Smiley" - "Love is For Free"
Xonia - "My Beautiful One"
Andra -" Something New"
Andreea Banica - "Love in Brasil"
Inna - "Sun Is Up"
Alexandra Stan - "Get Back (ASAP)"

Best Dance/Pop Act

Inna
Smiley
Alex
DJ Project

Latin

Best Latin Crossover

Andra - Abelia
Andreea Banica - "Love in Brasil"
Keo - "Liber"

Pop rock

Best Pop Rock Album

Iris - "12 Porti"
Vunk - "Ca pe Vremuri"
Directia 5 - "Romantic"

Best Pop Rock Song

Directia 5 - "Ai Un Loc"
Iris - "Cat As Vrea Sa Zbor"
Taxi - "Cele doua Cuvinte"
Bere Gratis - "Stai Pe Acelasi"
Vunk - "Vreau O Tara ca Afara"

Best Pop Rock Act

Iris
Vunk
Directia 5

References 

Romanian music awards
2011 music awards
2011 in Romanian music